The Private Life of Helen of Troy is a 1927 American silent film about Helen of Troy based on the 1925 novel of the same name by John Erskine, and adapted to screen by Gerald Duffy. The film was directed by Alexander Korda and starred María Corda as Helen, Lewis Stone as Menelaus, and Ricardo Cortez as Paris.

Coming at the end of the silent film era, it was nominated for an Academy Award in 1929, the year of the Awards' inception, in the category of Best Title Writing. Duffy died on June 25, 1928, and was the first person to be posthumously nominated for an Academy Award.

That same year, the first "talkie", The Jazz Singer, received an honorary award for introducing sound to film, and the category for which The Private Life of Helen of Troy was nominated was dropped by the second Academy Awards.

Two sections from the beginning and end, running about 27–30 minutes in total, are reportedly all that survive of The Private Life of Helen of Troy; they are preserved by the British Film Institute.

Cast
María Corda - Helen
Lewis Stone - Menelaus
Ricardo Cortez - Paris
George Fawcett - Eteoneus
Alice White - Adraste
Bill Elliott - Telemachus
Tom O'Brien - Ulysses
Bert Sprotte - Achilles
Mario Carillo - Ajax
Charles Puffy - Malapokitoratoreadetos
George Kotsonaros - Hector
Emilio Gorgato - Sarpedon
Constantine Romanoff - Aeneas
Alice Adair - Aphrodite
Helen Fairweather - Athena

See also
List of incomplete or partially lost films

References

External links

1927 films
1920s historical comedy films
American historical comedy films
American silent feature films
American black-and-white films
Films directed by Alexander Korda
Films based on American novels
Trojan War films
First National Pictures films
Cultural depictions of Helen of Troy
Films with screenplays by Gerald Duffy
1920s American films
Silent American comedy films
Silent war films
Silent historical comedy films